Mark Waller may refer to:
Sir Mark Waller (judge) (born 1940), Vice-President of the Civil Division of the Court of Appeal of England and Wales
Mark Waller (doctor) (born 1957), club doctor of Leicester City Football Club
Mark Waller (politician) (born 1969), member of the Colorado House of Representatives